Teófilo Duarte (6 October 1898 – 16 May 1958) was a Portuguese colonial administrator, a military officer and a politician. He was a supporter of the Sidonist movement and the Estado Novo. 

He was born on 6 October 1898 in Idanha-a-Nova, eastern Portugal. An army officer, he was governor of Cape Verde from 9 March 1918 to 1919. Having participated in movements against the democratic governments, he was dismissed from the Portuguese Army in 1920, only to be reinstated after the 28 May 1926 coup d'état. He was governor of Portuguese Timor from 30 September 1926 to 22 December 1928. He encouraged Portuguese immigration to the colony, including political deportees. Under his rule, forced labour took a rise in East Timor.

He was Minister of Colonies from 4 February 1947 to 2 August 1950 under Prime Minister Salazar. On 1 September 1950, he was awarded with the Grand Cross of the Military Order of Christ.

See also
List of colonial governors of Cape Verde
List of colonial governors of Portuguese Timor

References

External links

1898 births
1958 deaths
Colonial heads of Cape Verde
Colonial heads of Portuguese Timor
Portuguese colonial governors and administrators
Portuguese politicians
Governors of Portuguese Timor
People from Idanha-a-Nova